Rachel Odile Lempereur (14 February 1896 – 8 Octobers 1980) was a French politician. She was elected to the National Assembly in 1945 as one of the first group of French women in parliament. She served in the National Assembly until 1958.

Biography
Lempereur was born Rachel Odile Nuez in Lille in 1896. She married Marcel Lempereur in 1923 and worked as a primary school teacher in Lille. An active trade unionist, she came to the attention of Jean-Baptiste Lebas, who gave her responsibility for socialist propaganda amongst workers in Nord department.

During the Nazi occupation Lempereur was a director of a school, clandestinely managing the teachers' union and supporting the French resistance. Following the war she became a politician on behalf of the French Section of the Workers' International (SFIO). In 1945 she was elected to the council of Lille Sud-Est canton. She was subsequently an SFIO candidate in Nord department in the October 1945 National Assembly elections. The third-placed candidate on the SFIO list, she was elected to parliament, becoming one of the first group of women in the National Assembly.  After being elected she became a member of the National Education and Fine Arts Commission and the Family and Population Commission. She was re-elected in the June 1946, November 1946, 1951 and 1956 elections. Focussing largely on educational issues, she remained a member of the  National Education Commission, serving as its vice president from 1946 to 1958 and then president from 1956 to 1958.

In the 1958 elections Lempereur contested Nord's 2nd constituency, but was defeated by Henri Duterne of the Union for the New Republic. She ran unsuccessfully again in 1962, 1967 and 1968. She was expelled from the Socialist Party (PS) in 1973 after running against a joint PS–French Communist Party candidate in the cantonal elections. She died in Saint-André-lez-Lille in 1980.

References

1896 births
Politicians from Lille
French schoolteachers
French Section of the Workers' International politicians
Deputies of the 1st National Assembly of the French Fourth Republic
Deputies of the 2nd National Assembly of the French Fourth Republic
Deputies of the 3rd National Assembly of the French Fourth Republic
Women members of the National Assembly (France)
1980 deaths
20th-century French women politicians